Eastern Punjab may refer to:

 Punjab, India, mostly used in contexts where Western Punjab refers to Punjab of Pakistan
 East Punjab, a former province of the dominion of India

See also
 Eastern Punjabi (disambiguation)